The 1961 Houston Cougars football team was an American football team that represented the University of Houston as an independent during the 1961 NCAA University Division football season. In its fifth and final season under head coach Hal Lahar, the team compiled a 5–4–1 record. Ken Bolin, Bill Brown, and Joe Bob Isbell were the team captains. The team played its home games at Rice Stadium in Houston.

Schedule

References

Houston
Houston Cougars football seasons
Houston Cougars football